Prasad is an Indian name, used both as a personal and family name.

Geographical distribution
As of 2014, 95.9% of all known bearers of the surname Prasad were residents of India, 0.8% were residents of Nepal and 0.7% were residents of Fiji. In India, the frequency of the surname was higher than national average in the following states and union territories:
 1. Bihar (1: 71)
 2. Uttarakhand (1: 103)
 3. Sikkim (1: 147)
 4. Uttar Pradesh (1: 162)
 5. Delhi (1: 196)

Notable people with the last name Prasad
Kamta Prasad, Indian actor who acted in Achhut Kannya (1936), and Nirmala (1938).
Ananda Prasad (born 1928), biochemist specialising in Zinc metabolism
Badri Nath Prasad (1899–1966), Indian politician member of Rajya Sabha (1964–1966)
Biman Prasad, Indo-Fijian politician
Brajkishore Prasad (1877–1946), lawyer, Indian independence activist
Brij Behari Prasad, murdered minister in the government of Bihar, India
Devi Sri Prasad (born 1979), Indian music composer, lyricist, singer, and director
Eswar Prasad 
Ganesh Prasad (1876–1935), Indian mathematician
H. S. Mahadeva Prasad (1958–2017), Indian politician
H. Y. Sharada Prasad (1924–2008), Indian civil servant, journalist and writer, media adviser to Indira Gandhi
Ihswari Prasad (1888–1986), Indian historian
Jaishankar Prasad (1890–1937), noted Hindi writer
Jitin Prasada (born 1973), Indian politician from the Bhartiya Janata Party
Jitendra Prasada (1938–2001), Indian politician and a former Vice-President of the Indian National Congress

Kavirayani Ramakrishna Prasad (born 1969), Indian chemist, recipient of Shanti Swarup Bhatnagar Prize (2014)
L. V. Prasad (1908–1994), Indian film actor, producer and director
Mahaveer Prasad (1939–2010), Indian politician, Governor of Himachal Pradesh (1995, 1996–1997), member of Lok Sabha (from 2004)
Malur R. Narasimha Prasad (1923–1987), Indian endocrinologist at the World Health Organisation
M. S. K. Prasad (born 1975), Indian cricketer, chief selector of the Indian National Cricket Team
Narendra Prasad (1946–2003), Indian actor, playwright, director, teacher and literary critic
Nutan Prasad (1945–2011), Indian film actor
R Prasad (born 1966), Indian cartoonist associated with Mail Today
Rajen Prasad, Indo-Fijian politician in New Zealand
Rajendra Prasad (1884–1963), first President of the Republic of India
Rajendra Prasad (actor) (born 1954), Telugu Indian film actor
Ramesh Prasad, Chairman of Prasad Studios
Ravi Shankar Prasad (born 1954), Indian lawyer, politician, Minister of Law and Justice, Minister of Electronics and Information Technology, and Minister of Communications
Shweta Basu Prasad, Indian actress
Sreekar Prasad (born 1963), Indian film editor
Venkatesh Prasad (born 1969), Indian cricketer
Vijay Prashad, Indian historian and journalist
Vinay Prasad (born 1982), American hematologist-oncologist
V. Vijayendra Prasad (born 1942), Indian film screenwriter and director
Yarlagadda Lakshmi Prasad, Indian writer and politician, Chairman of the A.P. Hindi Academy, member of Rajya Sabha (1996–2002)

Notable people with the middle name Prasad
Amod Prasad Upadhyay (born 1936), Nepali politician
Ananta Prasad Paudel (born 1962), Nepali politician
Bidur Prasad Sapkota, Nepali politician
Bishweshwar Prasad Koirala (1914–1982), former Prime Minister of Nepal
Dilendra Prasad Badu, Nepali politician
Durga Prasad Bhattarai, Nepali representative 
Girija Prasad Joshi (1939–1987), Nepali poet
Girija Prasad Koirala (1924–2010), former Prime Minister of Nepal
Gopal Prasad Rimal (1918–1973), Nepali poet
Govind Prasad Lohani, Nepali politician
Guru Prasad Mainali, Nepali storywriter
Hora Prasad Joshi (1925–2010), Nepali Justice
Kali Prasad Baskota (born 1979), Nepali singer
Keshab Prasad Badal (born 1948), Nepali politician
Keshav Prasad Mainali, Nepali politician
Khadga Prasad Oli (born 1952), Former Prime Minister of Nepal
Krishna Prasad Bhattarai (1924–2011), Former Prime Minister of Nepal
Krishna Prasad Koirala, Nepali politician
Kul Prasad Nepal, Nepali politician
Lalu Prasad Yadav (born 1948), Indian politician
Laxmi Prasad Devkota (1909–1959), Nepali Poet; titled Maha Kavi
Madhav Prasad Ghimire (1919–2020), Nepali Poet; titled Rastra Kavi
Man Prasad Khatri (born 1963), Nepali politician
Mata Prasad, Indian Administrative Service officer
Matrika Prasad Koirala (1912–1997), former Prime Minister of Nepal
Nagendra Prasad Rijal (1927–1994), former Prime Minister of Nepal
Nanda Prasad Adhikari, Nepali 
Narayan Prasad Adhikari, Nepali politician
Rabindra Prasad Adhikari (1969–2019), Nepali politician
Ram Raja Prasad Singh (1936–2012), Nepali politician
Rameshwor Prasad Dhungel, Nepali politician
Subash Prasad Khakurel (born 1993), Nepali national cricketer
Tanka Prasad Acharya (1912–1992), former Prime Minister of Nepal
Tarini Prasad Koirala (1923–1973), Nepali politician
Thakur Prasad Mainali (born 1934), Nepali artist
Vinaya Prasad (born Vinaya Bhat), South Indian film and television actress
Yadav Prasad Pant (1928–2007), Nepali economist

Notable people with the given name Prasad
 Ahuti Prasad (1958–2015), Indian character actor
 Dhammika Prasad (born 1983), Sri Lankan cricketer
 Devendra Prasad Gupta, Indian academician and a former vice chancellor of Ranchi University
 Prasad Babu, South Indian film actor
 Prasad Barve, Indian television actor
 Prasad Bidapa, fashion designer specialised in training models for the Miss India beauty pageants
 Prasad Murella, Indian film cinematographer
 Prasad Shrikant Purohit, Indian army officer
 Samta Prasad (1921–1994), Indian classical musician, tabla player

See also
Persaud
Prasad (disambiguation)
Prasada Rao (disambiguation)

References

Indian given names
Indian surnames